Duquesne University of the Holy Spirit (also known as Duquesne University or Duquesne) is a private Catholic research university in Pittsburgh, Pennsylvania. Founded by members of the Congregation of the Holy Spirit, Duquesne first opened as the Pittsburgh Catholic College of the Holy Ghost in October 1878 with an enrollment of 40 students and a faculty of six. In 1911, the college became the first Catholic university-level institution in Pennsylvania. It is the only Spiritan institution of higher education in the world. It is named for an 18th-century governor of New France, Michel-Ange Duquesne de Menneville.

Duquesne has since expanded to over 9,300 graduate and undergraduate students within a self-contained  hilltop campus in Pittsburgh's Bluff neighborhood. The school maintains an associate campus in Rome and encompasses ten schools of study. The university hosts international students from more than 80 countries although most students—about 80%—are from Pennsylvania or the surrounding region. Duquesne is classified among "R2: Doctoral Universities – High research activity". There are more than 93,000 living alumni of the university including two cardinals and the current bishop of Pittsburgh.

The Duquesne Dukes compete in NCAA Division I. Duquesne men's basketball appeared twice in national championship games in the 1950s and won the NIT championship in 1955.

History 

The Pittsburgh Catholic College of the Holy Ghost was founded on October 1, 1878, by Fr. Joseph Strub and the Holy Ghost Fathers, who had been expelled from Germany during Otto von Bismarck's Kulturkampf six years earlier. When the college was founded, it had six faculty members and 40 students. The college obtained its state charter in 1882. Students attended classes in a rented space above a bakery on Wylie Avenue in downtown Pittsburgh. Duquesne established itself at its current location on the Bluff and built the original five-story red brick "Old Main" in 1885. At the time, it was the highest point on the Pittsburgh skyline.

On May 27, 1911, under the leadership of Fr. Martin Hehir, the college became the first Catholic institution of higher learning in Pennsylvania to become a university. It was subsequently renamed Duquesne University of the Holy Ghost, after Ange Duquesne de Menneville, Marquis du Quesne, the French governor of New France who first brought Catholic observances to the Pittsburgh area. The year 1913 saw the university record its first woman graduate, Sister M. Fides of the Sisters of Mercy. In 1914, the graduate school was established.

The 1920s were a time of expansion for the developing university. The campus grew to include its first single-purpose academic building, Canevin Hall, as well as a gymnasium and a central heating plant. Institutionally, the school grew to include the School of Pharmacy in 1925, a School of Music in 1926, and a School of Education in 1929. Hard times, however, came with the Wall Street Crash of 1929; plans for expansion had to be shelved.

The beloved Fr. Hehir was succeeded in 1931 by Fr. J. J. Callahan. Though Fr. Callahan was not as able an administrator as Fr. Hehir, his tenure did see the university add numerous new programs, a short-lived School for the Unemployed, and, in 1937, the Nursing School. The university's sports programs also thrived during the Depression era, with some of the greatest triumphs of the basketball and football teams occurring in that time period—a 6–0 football defeat of Pitt in 1936 was a high point of student exuberance. A university library was completed in 1940.

Some of the darkest years of the university's history passed during World War II, when the university was led by the young Fr. Raymond Kirk. The school's enrollment, which had been 3,100 in 1940, dropped to an all-time low in the summer of 1944, with a mere one thousand students enrolled. Fr. Kirk's health broke under the strain of leading the school through such struggles, and he was relieved of his duties by Fr. Francis P. Smith in 1946. After the war, the school faced a wave of veterans seeking higher education. In contrast to the lean war-time years, the 1949 enrollment peaked at 5,500, and space became an issue. Fr. Smith took advantage of the Lanham Act, which allowed him to acquire three barracks-type buildings from Army surplus. The science curriculum was expanded, and the School of Business Administration saw its enrollment rise to over two thousand. Also during this time, a campus beautification project was implemented and WDUQ, Pittsburgh's first college radio station, was founded.

An ambitious campus expansion plan was proposed by Fr. Vernon F. Gallagher in 1952. Assumption Hall, the first student dormitory, was opened in 1954, and Rockwell Hall was dedicated in November 1958, housing the schools of business and law. It was during the tenure of Fr. Henry J. McAnulty that Fr. Gallagher's ambitious plans were put to action. Between 1959 and 1980, the university renovated or constructed various buildings to form the academic infrastructure of the campus. Among these are College Hall, the music school and the library, as well as a new Student Union and Mellon Hall, along with four more dormitories. Although Fr. McAnulty's years as president saw tremendous expansion, a financial crisis in 1970 nearly forced the closure of the university. Students rallied to the cause, however, and set a goal of raising one million dollars to "Save Duquesne University". Students engaged in door-to-door fundraising and gathered nearly $600,000, enough to keep Duquesne afloat until the end of the crisis in 1973. It was also during Fr. McAnulty's time as president that Duquesne University played an important role in the shaping of the Catholic Charismatic Renewal, which has its roots in a retreat of several faculty members and students held in February 1967.

McAnulty was succeeded by Fr. Donald S. Nesti. Fr. Nesti's tenure in the 1980s saw construction begin on the A. J. Palumbo Center, which was dedicated in 1988, as well as an expansion of the law school. It was under the presidency of John E. Murray Jr., the university's first lay president, that the university developed into its modern institutional and physical form. Between 1988 and 2001, the university opened its first new schools in 50 years, including the Rangos School of Health Sciences, the Bayer School of Natural and Environmental Sciences, and the School of Leadership and Professional Advancement. Duquesne University continues to expand with its completion of the Power Center, a mixed-use development project on Forbes Avenue, and a new residence hall, which was completed in 2012.

The university plans to establish an osteopathic medical school which will admit its first class in the fall semester of 2023.

Insignia and tradition

Seal and coat of arms 
The Duquesne University coat of arms was modified from that of the family of its namesake, the Marquis du Quesne. A red book was added to adapt the arms of a French governor to that of a university. The coat of arms was designed by a Spiritan father and alumnus, Father John F. Malloy. They were then examined and partly revised by Pierre de Chaignon la Rose, a prominent ecclesiastical heraldic artist at the time. The design was adopted early in 1923 and used for the first time carved in high relief above Canevin Hall, then under construction. The first time the arms were incorporated into the seal of the university was for the commencement program of 1926.

The formal heraldic blazon of the arms is as follows: Argent, a lion sable armed and langued gules holding a book of the same edged or; on a chief party per pale azure and of the third, a dove displayed of the first, areoled of the fourth; motto, "Spiritus est qui vivificat."

Alma mater 
Alumnus Joseph Carl Breil, class of 1888, notable as being the first person to compose a score specifically for a motion picture, also composed the music for Duquesne University's alma mater. Father John F. Malloy, who also designed the university coat of arms, wrote the lyrics. The first performance of the song was in October 1920.

Alma Mater, old Duquesne, guide and friend of our youthful days.
We, thy sons and daughters all, our loyal voices raise.
The hours we spent at thy Mother knee and drank of wisdom's store
Shall e'er in mem'ry treasured be, tho' we roam the whole world o'er.
Then forward ever, dear Alma Mater, o'er our hearts unrivaled reign.
Onward ever, old Alma Mater! All hail to thee, Duquesne!

Class ring 
The Duquesne University class ring was first adopted in the 1920s, the same decade as the seal and alma mater. The first incarnation was approved by a 1925 student committee, and was an "octagonal deep blue stone held in place by four corner prongs." Two years later, another student committee replaced the blue stone with a synthetic ruby. The ring's design continued to evolve until 1936, as the prongs were replaced with a continuous metal bezel. The words "Duquesne", "University", and "Pittsburgh", accompanied the graduation year around the four sides of the bezel, and the shank on both sides was decorated with a motif adapted from the university's coat of arms. Originally an option, the embossed gold Gothic initial "D" became standard in the late 1930s. The Duquesne alumni website notes, "The golden initial, oversized stone and octagonal shape make the Duquesne ring stand out from those of other colleges and universities."

Campuses

Main campus 

Duquesne University has more than tripled in size from its early  site on Boyd's Hill to its present  main campus in Pittsburgh's Uptown neighborhood. Of the 31 buildings that make up the Bluff campus, several are recent constructions or renovations, including a health sciences facility (Rangos Hall), two recording studios, two parking garages, a multipurpose recreation center (Power Center), and a theater-classroom complex (Bayer Hall).

The "Old Main" Administration Building was the first structure to be constructed on campus. The Victorian Gothic structure is still used to house the administrative offices of the university. Canevin Hall, named after bishop of Pittsburgh Regis Canevin, was constructed in 1922 and is the oldest classroom building on campus; it was renovated in 1968 and again in 2009. These two buildings, as well Bayer Hall, the Richard King Mellon Hall of Science (designed by Ludwig Mies van der Rohe), and the Victorian Laval House, are at the west end of Academic Walk, a thoroughfare that provides pedestrian-only access to most of the campus, including the Student Union. The Union, which houses meeting rooms, three dining facilities, a Starbucks, a PNC branch, a recreation center, and an art gallery, is the center of campus life and student activities. Located on the northern side of campus is the Gumberg Library, a five-story structure opened in 1978 and holding extensive print and electronic collections.

Forbes and Fifth Avenue expansion 
The newest campus construction is the Power Center, named in honor of Father William Patrick Power, the university's first president. The multipurpose recreation facility on Forbes Avenue between Chatham Square and Magee Street, across from the university's Forbes Avenue entrance, adds to the student fitness facilities on campus. Other spaces include a Barnes & Noble bookstore containing a Starbucks café, Freshens, Red Ring Restaurant, and a conference center and ballroom. The  building was completed in early January 2008, and is the first stage of a development that aims to serve both the campus community and the surrounding neighborhood. In October 2010 the university announced the purchase of the eight story,  building at 600 Fifth Avenue from Robert Morris University, which had been RMU's Pittsburgh Center. This adds an additional 87 classrooms, 1,100 seats and new music facilities. Duquesne plans to utilize this building to allow further expansion of its graduate programs as applications have doubled since 2005. Duquesne also owns four other buildings along Fifth Avenue bordering on the PPG Paints Arena where the university now plays some of its home basketball games. The university announced plans on August 1, 2019, to build an  building along Forbes Avenue to house its new osteopathic medical school.
University owned WDUQ, NPR and jazz station, has relocated to offices in the Cooper Building and studios in Clement Hall.

Capital Region campus 
Until 2009, Duquesne University had an extension of the School of Leadership and Professional Advancement in Wormleysburg. Classes were also available at Fort Indiantown Gap.

Italian campus 
Since 2001, Duquesne has offered an Italian campus program. The facility, part of extensive grounds owned and managed by the Sisters of the Holy Family of Nazareth, is west of downtown Rome and just beyond Vatican City. University materials describe the campus as "a walled property enclosing beautiful gardens and walkways, [with] classrooms, computer facilities (including Internet), a small library, dining hall, recreational areas, and modernized living quarters complete with bathrooms in each double room."

The curriculum at the Italian campus includes history, art history, Italian language, philosophy, theology, sociology and economics, appropriate to the historical and cultural setting of Rome. The faculty of the program, largely constituted by visiting professors and resident scholars, is supplemented by a few distinguished professors from the home campus.

Academics and rankings 

Duquesne has a total student enrollment of 9,344 undergraduate and graduate students. The university has grown to comprise nine schools and other institutions, offering degree programs at the baccalaureate, professional, masters and doctoral levels in 189 academic programs. It is the only Spiritan institution of higher education in the world, and hosts international students from more than eighty different countries. The following institutions, along with their dates of founding, comprise Duquesne University:
 McAnulty College and Graduate School of Liberal Arts (1878)
 Bayer School of Natural and Environmental Sciences (formally split from College of Arts and Sciences in 1994)
 Thomas R. Kline School of Law of Duquesne University (1911)
 A.J. Palumbo School of Business Administration (1913)
 School of Pharmacy (1925)
 Mary Pappert School of Music (1926)
 School of Education (1929)
 School of Nursing (1937)
 Rangos School of Health Sciences (1990)

Student life

Residential life 

More than 3,600 students live at Duquesne University in five residence halls and one apartment complex. Assumption Hall, built in the 1950s, was the first residential hall on Duquesne's campus, and can accommodate 300 residents. Freshman dormitories include St. Ann's Hall and St. Martin's Hall, which were opened in the 1960s. The largest dormitory facility is Duquesne Towers, which houses 1,200 students, including Greek organizations. Other facilities include Vickroy Hall, built in 1997, and Brottier Hall, which was formerly an apartment complex before its purchase by the university in 2004.

On March 10, 2010, the university announced plans to construct a new residence hall. The need for a new residence hall was explained in a news release as being as the result of "retention rates well above national averages and a desire voiced by students to remain on campus during their junior and senior years". The new hall was constructed on the former site of Des Places Hall, an academic building named after Claude Poullart des Places, the founder of the Spiritan congregation. The hall retained its name and was opened for the fall 2012 semester.

Student groups 
Duquesne University hosts more than 150 student organizations, including 19 fraternities and sororities. Media organizations include a student radio station, WDSR (Duquesne Student Radio). Founded in 1984, it broadcasts solely through the Internet streaming audio. Other student media organizations include The Duquesne Duke campus newspaper and L'Esprit Du Duc, the university's yearbook. Duquesne also hosts a Student Government Association, a student-run Program Council, a Commuter Council, a representative Residence Hall Association, an Interfraternity Council, Panhellenic Council, the Knights of Columbus, and numerous departmental Honor Societies.

Greek life 
Fraternities on campus include Alpha Delta, Alpha Phi Delta, Delta Chi, Delta Sigma Pi, Gamma Phi (a local fraternity formed at Duquesne in 1916), Iota Phi Theta, Phi Kappa Theta, Sigma Alpha Epsilon, Sigma Nu, Sigma Tau Gamma, and Tau Kappa Epsilon. Sororities include Alpha Gamma Delta, Alpha Omicron Pi, Alpha Phi, Alpha Sigma Tau, Delta Zeta, Gamma Phi Beta, Sigma Kappa, and Zeta Tau Alpha. Most Duquesne chapters have suites or wings on campus, in the Duquesne Towers building, although there are some chapters that are not housed on campus.

Performance art 
Duquesne is the home of the Tamburitzans, the longest-running multicultural song and dance company in the United States. Their shows feature an ensemble of talented young folk artists dedicated to the performance and preservation of the music, songs, and dances of Eastern Europe and neighboring folk cultures. The performers are full-time students who receive substantial scholarship awards from the university, with additional financial aid provided by Tamburitzans Scholarship Endowment Funds.

The Mary Pappert School of Music hosts in-house and guest performers on a regular basis. Many music school ensembles also perform at Carnegie Music Hall in Oakland. Instrumental ensembles include the Symphony Orchestra (conductor Daniel Meyer), the Wind Symphony (conductor Robert Cameron) and Symphony Band (conductor Robert Cameron), the Contemporary Ensemble (conductor David Cutler), the Jazz Bands (conductors Sean Jones (trumpeter) and Mike Tomaro) and many other chamber groups. Vocal Ensembles include the Opera Workshop (director Meghan DeWald), the Voices of Spirit (conductor Dr. Caron Daley) and the Pappert Women's and Men's chorales. Performances are regular for each ensemble, and tours abroad are common for many.

The university also maintains three theater groups: the Red Masquers, Spotlight Musical Theatre Company, and the Medieval and Renaissance Players. The Masquers annually perform three main-stage plays, generally one classical, one modern, and one contemporary. In addition, the group performs two sets of one-act plays. "Premieres", which are student-written, are performed in the winter, while in the spring "One Acts for Charity" are selected from the works of professional playwrights. In recent years, the company has also participated in the Pittsburgh Monologue Project. Spotlight is a musical theatre company that produces two full-length Broadway musicals each year. The Renaissance and Medieval Players offer audiences a historical Medieval experience, performing religious plays, morality plays, and farces from the English Medieval and Early Renaissance periods, sometimes working in conjunction with the Red Masquers.

Athletics 

The Duquesne Dukes play varsity football, men's and women's basketball, women's bowling, men's and women's cross country, men's and women's soccer, women's swimming & diving, men's and women's tennis, men's and women's outdoor track & field, women's indoor track & field, women's lacrosse, women's rowing, and women's volleyball at the National Collegiate Athletic Association (NCAA) Division I level and in either the Atlantic 10 Conference or the Northeast Conference (football and bowling). In recent years, Duquesne football was a member of the NCAA Division I Metro Atlantic Athletic Conference. Duquesne has two ice hockey teams that play ACHA hockey as members of College Hockey Mid-America (Division 1) and College Hockey East (Division 3).

The fight song for Duquesne is "Victory Song (Red and Blue)."

Sustainability 
Duquesne was the first university in Pennsylvania to receive the EPA's Energy Star Combined Heat and Power Award for its natural gas turbine located on campus. Duquesne also uses an innovative ice cooling system that cools buildings and reduces peak energy demand. Duquesne's new Power Center facility has also achieved a LEED Silver Rating. Furthermore, Duquesne's Center for Environmental Research and Education (CERE) offers undergraduate and graduate degrees in environmental science and management. Duquesne has been evaluated by the 2009 and 2010 College Sustainability Report Card.

MBA-Sustainable Business Practices
The Palumbo-Donahue School of Business offers a full-time MBA-Sustainable Business Practices. This Sustainable MBA integrates sustainability-oriented coursework and consulting projects into the curriculum. This program has earned considerable recognition since its launch. In 2008, the program was awarded the Page Prize for excellence in business sustainability education. In 2018, Dr Robert Sroufe received the Aspen Institute "Ideas Worth Teaching" award, which recognizes professors and classes that redefine business education and practice. In 2020, the program was recognized as the top sustainability-focused MBA in the United States and the fourth best program in the world by Corporate Knights magazine.

Labor practices 
Like many US universities, Duquesne University has faced criticism for what has been described as hire-and-fire treatment of academics not on tenure track. Adjunct faculty have complained that they are paid approximately $12,000 annually for full-time work without the right to receive or buy into benefits or healthcare, and with the risk of their anticipated work being terminated with as little as two weeks' notice. Following concern that any complaints to administrators could lead to adjunct professors being dismissed, adjunct faculty have sought to unionize by joining the United Steelworkers union.  Particular criticism was applied to the university after the death of Margaret Mary Vojtko, an adjunct who was removed by campus police from her office, where she had been sleeping as she could not afford to heat her house while paying for chemotherapy. On a contract that did not pay for insurance, her pay had recently been cut by approximately a third.

The university has resisted attempts by adjunct faculty to join unions, arguing that its academic staff are exempt from employee rights due to its status as a religious institution. Former university president Charles Dougherty suggested that unionization "could lead to the compromise or loss of our Catholic and Spiritan identity".

Notable alumni 

Duquesne has over 93,000 living alumni, and the School of Law reports that almost 30 percent of the practicing lawyers in western Pennsylvania are graduates of Duquesne.

Duquesne has many alumni in the media and sports fields. These include the late John Clayton, a writer and reporter for ESPN; actor Tom Atkins; and Terry McGovern, the television actor, radio personality, voice-over specialist, and acting instructor.  German filmmaker Werner Herzog attended Duquesne, but did not graduate. Sports personalities Leigh Bodden, Chip Ganassi, Mike James, baseball hall-of-famer Cumberland Posey, and Chuck Cooper, the first African-American basketball player to be drafted in the NBA, all graduated from Duquesne, as did both the founder and his principal owner son of the Pittsburgh Steelers, Art and Dan Rooney. Singer Bobby Vinton, MLB pitcher Joe Beimel, and big-band composer Sammy Nestico are also alumni. Norm Nixon, who holds the all-time assist record for the Duquesne Dukes, played for the Los Angeles Lakers. Philadelphia 76ers point guard TJ McConnell spent two years playing for the Dukes. Miftah Ismail who is federal Minister of Finance and revenue in Pakistan is also an alumnus.

Duquesne has graduated at least three bishops and two cardinals in the Roman Catholic Church, including Bishops David Zubik, who is the current ordinary of the Roman Catholic Diocese of Pittsburgh; former Bishop of Pittsburgh Vincent Leonard; and David Bonnar, the Bishop of the Roman Catholic Diocese of Youngstown; and Cardinals Daniel DiNardo and Adam Maida. Figures in politics include Donald A. Bailey, Father James Cox, former Director of the CIA General Michael V. Hayden, former Lieutenant Governor of Pennsylvania Catherine Baker Knoll, U.S. Representative from Pennsylvania Bud Shuster, and United States ambassadors Thomas Patrick Melady and Dan Rooney. Duquesne has many alumni in the sciences including George Delahunty.

References

External links 

 
 Duquesne Athletics website

 
Educational institutions established in 1878
Universities and colleges in Pittsburgh
1878 establishments in Pennsylvania
Catholic universities and colleges in Pennsylvania
Holy Ghost Fathers
Association of Catholic Colleges and Universities